The 6th Parliament of the Province of Canada was summoned in January 1858, following the general election for the Legislative Assembly in December 1857. Sessions were held in Toronto in 1858 and then in Quebec City from 1859. The Parliament was dissolved in May 1861.

The 1858 parliamentary session was one of the longest and nastiest in Canadian history, opening in January 1858, just as news arrived from London that Queen Victoria had chosen Ottawa as the permanent seat for the Canadian government. In August 1858 the Macdonald-Cartier ministry carried out the divisive "double shuffle" that allowed the ministry to stay in power without facing by-elections.

The Speaker of the Legislative Assembly was Sir Henry Smith.

Canada East - 65 seats

Canada West - 65 seats

References 

Upper Canadian politics in the 1850s, Underhill (and others), University of Toronto Press (1967)

External links 
 Ontario's parliament buildings ; or, A century of legislation, 1792-1892 : a historical sketch
  Assemblée nationale du Québec (French)

06